Goran Jerković (born 10 November 1986) is a French former professional footballer who played as a forward. He ended his professional footballing career in 2021.

Club career
Jerković played in the French and Belgian lower divisions before signing a contract with Lithuainian club Žalgiris. In June 2010, during a league game against Šiauliai, he suffered serious injuries to his cruciate ligament and meniscus that put him out of action for half a year. He recovered from an injury in the 2011 season and extended his contract with Žalgiris, but soon afterwards the contract was terminated by mutual agreement.

During the off-season, he moved to rival A Lyga club Tauras Tauragė.

On 24 December 2011, he joined Esteghlal. He made his debut for Esteghlal against Shahrdari Yasuj in the Hazfi Cup. On 10 January 2012, he score his first goal for Esteghlal in his first start against Damash. His 91st-minute goal against Al-Rayyan in AFC Champions League helped Esteghlal earn a vital away victory. He also converted the winning penalty in 2012 Hazfi Cup Final.

In the summer of 2015, following spells with Thai clubs Buriram United, Bangkok Glass (loan) and Army United, he moved to Serbia and signed with Jagodina. He made only nine appearances before he was on the move again with brief stays at a number of clubs before signing for East Riffa of the Bahraini Premier League in January 2019.

On November 12, 2019, he signed with Italian club Calcio Foggia 1920 S.S.D. However, for administrative reasons, he was not qualified to play until 1 January 2020 so, instead, he joined Laotian side Lao Toyota FC without having made an official appearance for Foggia.

Statistics

Last Update 1 August 2017

Honours

Esteghlal
Hazfi Cup  (1) : 2011–12

Buriram United
Thai FA Cup  (1) : 2012
Thai League Cup  (1): 2012
Thai FA Cup  (1) : 2012 top score

East Riffa Club
Federation Cup  (1) : 2019

References

External links
 „Žalgirio“ puolėjui sezonas baigėsi. 
 

1986 births
Living people
Footballers from Lyon
Association football forwards
French footballers
French people of Serbian descent
Lyon La Duchère players
R. Olympic Charleroi Châtelet Farciennes players
FK Žalgiris players
Esteghlal F.C. players
Goran Jerkovic
Expatriate footballers in Thailand
FK Jagodina players
Serbian SuperLiga players
Expatriate footballers in Serbia
FK Iskra Danilovgrad players
Expatriate footballers in Montenegro
Persian Gulf Pro League players
French expatriate footballers
Expatriate footballers in Iran
French expatriate sportspeople in Iran
Calcio Foggia 1920 players
Expatriate footballers in Italy
Nepal Super League players
Expatriate footballers in Nepal